Joseph Brannon Dooley (December 13, 1889 – January 19, 1967) was a United States district judge of the United States District Court for the Northern District of Texas.

Education and career

Born in San Angelo, Texas, Dooley received a Bachelor of Laws from the University of Texas School of Law in 1911. He was in private practice in Amarillo, Texas from 1911 to 1947, serving as President of the State Bar of Texas from 1944 to 1945.

Federal judicial service

On January 8, 1947, Dooley was nominated by President Harry S. Truman to a seat on the United States District Court for the Northern District of Texas vacated by Judge James Clifton Wilson. Dooley was confirmed by the United States Senate on July 8, 1947, and received his commission on July 9, 1947. He served as Chief Judge in 1959, and assumed senior status on October 1, 1966. Dooley served in that capacity until his death on January 19, 1967.

References

Sources
 

1889 births
1967 deaths
University of Texas School of Law alumni
Judges of the United States District Court for the Northern District of Texas
United States district court judges appointed by Harry S. Truman
20th-century American judges